The Multi-Age Cluster Class or Middle Age Cluster Class (abbreviated MACC) is a gifted education program based in Vancouver, British Columbia, Canada. The MACC program has extended to several more schools located in the Greater Vancouver Regional District, namely Burnaby, Surrey, Coquitlam, Port Coquitlam and Port Moody. It is designed to enrich the regular school curriculum for students in Grades 4 to 7, and continues into Grade 8 in Coquitlam. The program opened its doors in 1994, one year after University Hill Secondary School's much-heralded University Transition Program for accelerated learners. Surrey began offering the MACC program in 2003.

The admission process for MACC involves several steps, where a child's suitability in the program is evaluated. A student is referred by their home school, challenge-class teacher, gifted case manager, or parent for consideration for admission. Students are given a cognitive test which gives the selection committee a deeper understanding of a student's intellectual abilities. After that, students who are seen as potential, gifted candidates are invited to spend one or two days in the classroom at the school they would potentially attend. Many MACC graduates have gone on to national and international success, including Brian Wong, twice nominated as a member of Top 30 Under 30.

Location
Currently, there are 3 schools hosting the MACC program in Vancouver. They are all administered by the Vancouver School Board.  
 Tecumseh Elementary School 
 Sir William Osler Elementary School
 Additionally, Kerrisdale Elementary School hosts the only French Immersion program. It was previously at General Gordon Elementary School, but was relocated due to seismic upgrades.

There were previous incarnations of MACC at Lord Nelson Elementary School, Queen Mary Elementary School, and David Livingstone Elementary School, but the program has shrunk slightly and relocated to its current base schools over the years due to a combination of VSB funding cuts, seismic upgrades, and perceived population shifts. In addition, there are other MACC programs outside Vancouver, such as Berkshire Park Elementary School, Hyland Elementary School, Erma Stephenson Elementary School and Chantrell Creek Elementary School, all of which are located in Surrey. All four Surrey programs are Grades 5–7. Surrey is currently in consideration of adding a high school program. In Vancouver, there also used to be a high school MACC program at Kitsilano Secondary School, though in Vancouver the concept has evolved into the 'Mini-School', of which most MACC graduates attend. The Tri-Cities (Port Coquitlam, Coquitlam, Port Moody) has three MACC equipped schools, namely Citadel Middle School, Hillcrest Middle School, and Kwayhquitlum Middle School. In 2014, two MACC sites were added in Burnaby (School District 41) at Capitol Hill Elementary School and Suncrest Elementary. Both of these schools have a grade 4/5 and 6/7 class. There is also a Mini-School program located at Alpha Secondary School.

See also
Vancouver School Board
Surrey School Board
Tecumseh Elementary School
Kerrisdale Elementary School
Sir William Osler Elementary School

References

External links
Multi Age Cluster Classes at the Vancouver School Board

Multi Age Cluster Class